Neuhaus am Klausenbach is a town in the district of Jennersdorf in the Austrian state of Burgenland.

Geography
Cadastral communities are Bonisdorf, Kalch, Krottendorf bei Neuhaus am Klausenbach and Neuhaus am Klausenbach.

Population

References

Cities and towns in Jennersdorf District
Slovenian communities in Burgenland